Peil is a surname. Notable people with the surname include:

 Edward Peil Sr. (1883–1958), American film actor
 Mary Beth Peil (born 1940), American actress and soprano